Ahmed Amar (born 22 June 1951 in Sidi Bel Abbès) is an Algerian former international player.

Honours

Clubs
USM Bel Abbès
 Algerian Championship: Third place 1969, 1983

International
 Palestine Cup of Nations: Third place 1972

References

External links
 Player profile - dzfootball

1951 births
People from Sidi Bel Abbès
Living people
Algerian footballers
Algeria international footballers
Association football midfielders
USM Bel Abbès players
21st-century Algerian people